Drake Stadium is an 11,700-capacity stadium in Los Angeles, California and the home of the UCLA Bruins men's and women's track and field teams. The stadium, built in 1969, is named for UCLA track legend Elvin C. "Ducky" Drake, who was a student-athlete, track coach and athletic trainer for over 60 years. It was the home of the UCLA Bruins men's and women's soccer teams until 2017. They are now playing at the soccer-specific Wallis Annenberg Stadium also located on the campus of University of California, Los Angeles.

There was a proposal in 1965 to build a 44,000 seat "Multi-Purpose Stadium" on campus, for UCLA Bruins track meets and varsity football games, rather than the Bruins using the Los Angeles Memorial Coliseum for home field.  In both spring and fall 1965, UCLA students "voted by a two-to-one majority against the proposal to use fee funds to build a football stadium."  Additionally, the proposal was opposed by influential area residents and politicians.  By February 1966 UCLA had scaled back the project to the Drake Stadium configuration.  Although the football stadium never became a reality, there have been UCLA Bruins football scrimmage games played in the stadium.

Drake Stadium has hosted the Pacific-10 (now Pac-12) Track and Field Championships, the USA Outdoor Track and Field Championships in 1976-77-78, the Pacific-8 Championships in 1970 and 1977 and the CIF California State Meet for high schools in 1969-71-77. The facility hosted the first-ever California-Nevada Championships on April 30-May 1, 1994. It also has hosted other student events such as concerts and graduation ceremonies.

The track at Drake Stadium is named for gold medalist Rafer Johnson and his wife Betty. The field is named for UCLA alumnus Frank Marshall, a film producer.

Notable athletes
 Carlos Bocanegra
 Ato Boldon
 Jonathan Bornstein
 Tom Bradley
 Lauren Cheney
 Danny Everett
 Benny Feilhaber
 Dawn Harper
 Joanna Hayes
 Monique Henderson
 Florence Griffith-Joyner
 Jackie Joyner-Kersee
 Meb Keflezighi
 Rafer Johnson
 Cobi Jones
 Steve Lewis
 Mike Powell
 Jackie Robinson
 Mike Tully
 C.K. Yang
 Kevin Young
 Marvell Wynne

References

External links 
 Drake Stadium at UCLA

UCLA Bruins track and field
UCLA Bruins men's soccer venues
UCLA Bruins women's soccer venues
University of California, Los Angeles buildings and structures
Athletics (track and field) venues in Los Angeles
College soccer venues in California
College track and field venues in the United States
Soccer venues in Los Angeles
Sports venues completed in 1969
1969 establishments in California